The Audubon Park Historic District is located on five blocks in the Washington Heights neighborhood of Manhattan, New York City, between West 155th Street and West 158th Street, and between Broadway and Edward M. Morgan Place on the east and Riverside Drive West on the west.  It consists of 19 large apartment buildings and one duplex house, and abuts the Audubon Terrace Historic District on the southeast.  It is named for naturalist John James Audubon, who purchased 20 acres of land there in 1841, at a time when the area was still mostly farms, woodland and the country estates of the rich.  After his death, the estate was sold off in parcels for development by Audubon's widow, which is when it became known as "Audubon Park".

The area was designated an historic district by the New York City Landmarks Preservation Commission on May 12, 2009.

See also

List of New York City Landmarks
Audubon Park Historic District, Kentucky
Audubon Terrace

References
Notes

External links

"Audubon Park" website

Historic districts in Manhattan
New York City Designated Landmarks in Manhattan
New York City designated historic districts
2009 establishments in New York City
Washington Heights, Manhattan